Len Bratley (1926 – 25 August 2011) was an English presenter on the Hospital Radio station, Trust AM, based in the Bassetlaw District General Hospital in Worksop. Bratley celebrated his 85th birthday in 2011, and was dubbed 'The Oldest DJ In Town'.

He was originally a patient at the hospital, and listened to the hospital radio station during his stay. He won a competition prize, which was delivered to his home by one of the volunteer presenters. Bratley commented that the station did not play much big band music, and it was suggested that he may like to come along and present a show on that theme. His show became one of the most listened to on the station.

The UK National Lottery's Alan Dedicoat provided some material from which Bratley's on-air jingles  were made, announcing the Tuesday Teatime Nostalgia Show, so popular was the show that a further edition was added on Friday teatime from 4 to 6 pm, under the title The Friday HOOT. Bratley explained that this stood for Hospital (radio) On Old Time. Jingles for this second show were voiced by Stuart Barrett of the BBC in Manchester.

Len Bratley died at home on the morning of 25 August 2011, aged 85.

References

1926 births
2011 deaths
British radio personalities
People from Worksop